Simte is a Kuki-Chin language of India. It is spoken primarily by the Simte in Northeastern India, who are concentrated in Manipur and adjacent areas of Mizoram and Assam. The dialect spoken in Manipur exhibits partial mutual intelligibility with the other Kuki-Chin dialects of the area including Thadou, Hmar, Vaiphei, Paite, Kom and Gangte. It is written in Latin script.

References

Kuki-Chin languages
Languages of Manipur